A Day in the Life of Jody Breeze is the debut album by Boyz n da Hood's member Jody Breeze, released in 2005.

The first single from the album was "Stay Fresh", featuring and produced by Jazze Pha.

This album was not released in stores. Featured guests are: Jazze Pha, Mannie Fresh, Trick Daddy and more. Jody Breeze said in 2008 that he's going to re-release the album with the same title.

Track listing
Source: HipHopForFree.com

References

2005 debut albums
Albums produced by Jazze Pha
Albums produced by Lil Jon
Albums produced by Mannie Fresh